The Stoke Spitfires were a British speedway team competing in the Conference League. The Spitfires were the junior team of the Stoke Potters. The Spifires won the Conference League Four-Team Championship in 2006.

References

External links
Stoke Potters - BBC Where I Live - Stoke and Staffordshire

Sport in Staffordshire
Sport in Stoke-on-Trent